Enviomycin (INN, also called tuberactinomycin N) is an antibiotic drug, isolated from Streptomyces griseoverticillatus var. tuberacticus. It is used in the treatment of tuberculosis.

References 

Polypeptide antibiotics